The Scottish Industrial Railway Centre is an industrial heritage museum operated by the Ayrshire Railway Preservation Group. The centre owns a number of standard gauge steam locomotives and diesel locomotives as well as some narrow gauge items and an extensive collection of photographs.

History 

The centre was based at the former Minnivey Colliery, Dalmellington, East Ayrshire, Scotland, from 1980; but, following problems with the lease, the Group decided in 2002 to move the centre to the nearby Dunaskin Heritage Centre.

During 2005 council funding was withdrawn from the Heritage Centre causing it to close, but the railway was still able to start running steam-hauled rides at the Dunaskin site, using a borrowed locomotive.

A lack of locomotive availability curtailed operations during 2006 and 2007 but, following the completion of the boiler swap and overhaul of Andrew Barclay 0-4-0ST N.C.B. No. 10, a series of successful steam days have been held since 2008.  In 2023 the group were told that the buildings they use are to be sold.

Steam locomotives 
The museum has a collection of Andrew Barclay Sons & Co. steam locomotives.
Andrew Barclay  N.C.B. No. 16. built in 1910. On display at Dunaskin and will be restored after No. 277644 Tees Storage.
Andrew Barclay  N.C.B. No. 19. built in 1918. Stored out of use, partially cosmetically restored.
Andrew Barclay  No. 8. built in 1928. Operational after its overhaul was completed in July 2015. Steam to operate the locomotive is provided by No. 10. The only operational Fireless locomotive in the UK and operates alongside No.10 on steam days.
Andrew Barclay  N.C.B. No. 10. built in 1947. Operational after swapping boilers with No. 19 and is now running after a boiler frailer in 2021. 
Andrew Barclay  N.C.B. No. 23. built in 1949.Stored in a line of locos and rolling stock.
Andrew Barclay  N.C.B. No. 25. built in 1954.Awaiting restoration.
Andrew Barclay  N.C.B. No. 1. built in 1955.It will be a of the last steam locomotives to be restored.

Diesel Locomotives
Reference
Andrew Barclay Sons & Co.  "Powfoot" No. 1. Operational and regularly performs shunting duties.
Andrew Barclay  No. 399. Undergoing overhaul and will be up and running for 2023.
Hunslet Engine Company  No. 107. Stored out of use.
North British  No. 277644 "Tees Storage". I will restored after No.399.
Ruston and Hornsby  No. BE116. Stored out of use.
Ruston and Hornsby  No. 324 "Blinkin Bess". Stored out of use.
Ruston and Hornsby  No. 417890 "Johnnie Walker". Awaiting restoration.
Ruston and Hornsby  No. 421697. Stored out of use.
Sentinel  No. 10012. Operational and regularly performs shunting duties.

Rolling Stock
The centre is home to a wide variety of goods wagons including British Railways 16 ton mineral wagons and pallet vans, the latter having been formerly owned and operated by Scotch Whisky manufacturer Johnnie Walker. The railway has a London, Midland and Scottish Railway Inspection Saloon which has currently been repaired.

External links 

 Official website
 Ayrshire Railway Preservation Group
 Industrial Locomotive Society
 Video footage of The Scottish Industrial Railway Centre
 Andrew Barclay 0-4-0 fireless locomotive at Dunaskin, East Ayrshire

References 

Heritage railways in Scotland
Transport in East Ayrshire
Railway museums in Scotland
Museums in East Ayrshire